Robert L. Holmes (December 28, 1935) is a Professor Emeritus of Philosophy at the University of Rochester, and an expert on issues of peace and nonviolence. Holmes specializes in ethics, and in social and political philosophy. He has written numerous articles and several books on those topics, and has been invited to address national and international conferences.

Early life

Holmes earned his undergraduate degree from Harvard University and Ph.D. in philosophy from the University of Michigan.

Career

Holmes joined the faculty at the University of Rochester in 1962.

In 1998, Holmes was appointed to the newly established Rajiv Gandhi Chair in Peace and Disarmament at Jawaharlal Nehru University in New Delhi, India, where he shaped the mission of the chair on instruction, research, and lectures.

While serving on the faculty at the University of Rochester, his lectures were always eagerly anticipated by students of the humanities as well as the sciences. He received the Edward Peck Curtis Award for Undergraduate Teaching in 2001 and the Professor of the Year Award in Humanities in 2006. At the 2007 convocation ceremony, Holmes was awarded the Goergen Award for Distinguished Achievement and Artistry in Undergraduate Teaching. Also, Holmes is known for being one of the very few professors to receive perfect or near perfect reviews every year since the university began student review services in 2001.

During the course of an academic career which has spanned over forty years, Holmes has held a variety of scholarly positions including: Fulbright Fellow at Moscow State University and Visiting professor at Notre Dame, Hamilton College and the University of Texas at Austin. In addition, he served as an editor of the philosophical journal Public Affairs Quarterly, contributed to the editorial review board of Social Theory and Practice  and participated on the national board of the Fellowship of Reconciliation.  He was also a longtime adviser to the University of Rochester Undergraduate Philosophy Council.  In 1992 he also served as president of the professional organization Concerned Philosophers for Peace which strives to improve international understanding and peace through scholarly analysis of the causes of war.

Holmes is the author of several comprehensive texts on the subject of moral philosophy. Included among his publications is a collaborative work undertaken in 1968 with Lewis White Beck - a noted scholar on Kantian ethics (Philosophical Inquiry: An Introduction to Philosophy). He also coauthored a work  in 2005 with Barry L. Gan - Director of the Center for Nonviolence at St. Bonaventure University (Nonviolence in Theory and Practice). In addition, he has published numerous papers in several academic peer-reviewed journals including: Analysis, Ethics, International Philosophical Quarterly, Journal of Medicine and Philosophy, Journal of Value Inquiry, Mind, The Monist, The Philosophical Forum, and The Review of Metaphysics.

As of 2009, Holmes is semi-retired, although he still teaches at the University of Rochester during some semesters.

Moral philosophy

Over the course of the past forty years, Holmes has addressed several interrelated moral dilemmas posed in the modern age including terrorism and armed conflict in general. In 2013 he argued that identifying viable moral alternatives to such circumstances is relevant even when mankind is faced with the threat of mass destruction posed by nuclear weapons. The temptation to retreat into a form of modified existential nihilism when confronted by such disruptive existential factors is clearly rejected. After reviewing  several competing moral positions which societies might adopt, he proposes that both pacifism and nonviolence have the potential to mitigate these disruptive paradigms and serve as the basis of a morally viable prototype for humanity's future.

In 2016, Holmes also offered a robust philosophical defense of pacifism and its application in a world which is plagued with recurrent outbursts of international violence. At the center of his analysis is the proposition that a moral presumption against war in general exists among civilized beings and that warfare remains morally unjustified until that presumption is overturned. Just war theory in general is inadequate to the task of surmounting that moral presumption in Holmes' view. As a result, warfare as practiced in the modern era is unjustified and best described as morally repugnant.

Publications

Texts
Included among Robert L. Holmes publications are the following texts:
Basic Moral Philosophy by Robert L. Holmes
 Introduction to Applied Ethics by Robert L. Holmes 
 Kant's Legacy: Essays in Honor of Lewis White Beck Editor: Predrag Cicovacki. Contributor: Robert L. Holmes -"Consequentialism and its Consequences".
  Nonviolence in Theory and Practice by Robert L. Holmes and Barry L. Gan 
 On War and Morality  by Robert L. Holmes 
 Philosophic Inquiry: An Introduction to Philosophy by Lewis White Beck and Robert L. Holmes   
 Pacifism: A Philosophy of Nonviolence by Robert L. Holmes
 The Ethics of Nonviolence - Essays by Robert L. Holmes Editor: Predrag Cicovacki, Bloomsbury, USA on books.google.com
 The Augustinian Tradition Editor: Gareth B. Matthews. Contributor: Robert L. Holmes - "St. Augustine and the Just War Theory"

Journal articles
Selected peer-reviewed articles published by Robert L. Holmes include:

 "The Metaethics of Pacifism and Just War". Philosophical Forum Quarterly (2015):2-15
 "Just War: Principles and Causes". International Philosophical Quarterly(1997):483-484
 "The Limited Relevance of Analytical Ethics to the Problems of Bioethics." The Journal of Medicine and Philosophy (1990):143-159  
 "Is Morality a System of Hypothetical Imperatives?". Analysis (1974):96-100
 "University Neutrality and ROTC". Ethics(1973):177
 "John Dewey's Social Ethics". The Journal of Value Inquiry (1973):274-280
 "John Dewey's Moral Philosophy in Contemporary Perspective". The Review of Metaphysics (1966):42-70
 "The Development of John Dewey's Ethical Thought". The Monist(1964):392-406
 "The Case Against Ethical Naturalism". Mind (1964):291-295

See also
 Nonviolence
 Mahatma Gandhi
 Pacifism

References

External links
 Basic Moral Philosophy by  Robert L. Holmes on books.google.com 
 On War and Morality by Robert L. Holmes on books.google.com
 The Ethics of Nonviolence - Essays by Robert L. Holmes Editor: Predrag Cicovacki on books.google.com
 Introduction to Applied Ethics by Robert L.Holmes on books.google.com
 Kant's Legacy: Essays in Honor of Lewis White Beck Editor: Predrag Cicovacki. Contributor: Robert L. Holmes -"Consequentialism and its Consequences"  on books.google.com
 The Augustinian Tradition Editor: Gareth B. Matthews. Contributor: Robert L. Holmes - "St. Augustine and the Just War Theory" on books.google.com
 Robert L. Holmes on worldcat.org

1935 births
20th-century American male writers
20th-century American non-fiction writers
20th-century American philosophers
20th-century essayists
21st-century American male writers
21st-century American non-fiction writers
21st-century American philosophers
21st-century essayists
American ethicists
American male essayists
American male non-fiction writers
American pacifists
American philosophy academics
American political philosophers
American social commentators
Analytic philosophers
Harvard University alumni
Academic staff of Jawaharlal Nehru University
Lecturers
Living people
Nonviolence advocates
Philosophers of culture
Philosophers of history
Philosophers of social science
Philosophers of war
Philosophy writers
Social philosophers
Theorists on Western civilization
University of Michigan alumni
University of Rochester faculty